Nurabad (also Romanized as Nūrābād and Noor Abad) is a village in Khuzi Rural District, Varavi District, Mohr County, Fars Province, Iran. At the 2006 census, its population was 1,064, in 231 families.

References 

Populated places in Mohr County